The Sautee Valley Historic District comprises the southern half of the Sautee Valley, near Sautee, Georgia.  Lynch Mountain is to the southeast, Grimes Nose is to the northwest, and the Nacoochee Valley is to the southwest. There are historic and prehistoric resources, mostly along the edges of the valley.  Historic structures include houses, farms, stores, and other typical buildings dating from the 19th and early 20th centuries.  Prehistoric resources include ceremonial and settlement sites and feature Nacoochee Mound, an earthwork platform mound on the banks of the Chattahoochee River.  This area is adjacent to the Nacoochee Valley Historic District.  The historic district was added to the National Register of Historic Places in 1986.

References

Historic districts on the National Register of Historic Places in Georgia (U.S. state)
National Register of Historic Places in White County, Georgia